Zoviyeh-ye Do (also Romanized as Zovīyeh-ye Do, Zoveyeh Do, and Zovīyeh Do; also known as Zovīyeh-ye Pā’īn) is a village in Shoaybiyeh-ye Sharqi Rural District, Shadravan District, Shushtar County, Khuzestan Province, Iran. At the 2006 census, its population was 998, in 160 families.

References 

Populated places in Shushtar County